A voltage portal extends a voltage source to the outside of an electrical enclosure in an encapsulated non-conductive housing designed for a Non-contact voltage detector (NCVD) to sense voltage if placed into the voltage portal.

Overview
A voltage portal avoids voltage exposure for workers by extending the voltage source points to the outside of electrical enclosures. Each voltage point resides in an encapsulated non-conductive housing designed to ensure that a NCVD senses voltage if placed into the voltage portal (Fig. 1). Because a voltage portal contains live voltage and mounts on the outside of an electrical enclosure, it must be robust to ensure long term safety. The UL enclosure type rating of the voltage portal must also match the enclosure rating.

Maintenance work
Many maintenance workers carry NCVD pens or AC voltage detectors in their tool belts. This portable device allows workers to quickly check electrical conductors for live voltage without actually touching the bare wire. The NCVD can sense voltage when positioned close to the live conductor without making a hard-wired electrical connection. A voltage portal is used to assist workers in creating an electrically safe work condition as part of a lockout-tagout procedure before beginning work on electrical or mechanical equipment.

References

External links 
 http://graceport.com/assets/files/Application%20Notes/Application_VoltagePortals%20Improve%20NCVD.pdf
 http://www.mt-online.com/component/content/article/295-june2011/1794-electrical-safety-sense-better-voltage-detection.html

Electrical components
Electrical safety